is a Japanese stage and television actor from Shiga Prefecture. Minehiro portrayed Ryu Terui, the Superintendent of the police force and the secondary hero of the television series Kamen Rider W.

Roles

Movies

TV
Poor Man Bombīmen – Tetsu Igarashi
Homeroom on the Beachside – Akihiro Wada
Handsome ★ Suits: The TV – Himself
Sazae-san 40th Anniversary Special Drama – Driving school students
Kamen Rider W – Ryu Terui
Saturday Premium: I'll Teach You How to Find a Dream! – Himself

External links
Official profile

1989 births
Living people
Japanese male film actors
Japanese male stage actors
People from Shiga Prefecture
Japanese male television actors
21st-century Japanese male actors